RNV may refer to:

 Armavia (ICAO: RNV), a former Armenian airline (1996–2013)
 Cleveland Municipal Airport (Mississippi) (FAA: RNV)
 Radio Nacional de Venezuela, a government radio station in Venezuela that began broadcasting in 1936
 Raniwara railway station (station code: RNV), in Jalor district, Rajasthan, India
 Rhein-Neckar-Verkehr, German transport company
 Russie.NEI.Visions in English, an online collection of policy papers
 Rhythm & Vines (RnV) annual music festival near Gisborne, New Zealand

See also
 RNVR, British Royal Navy Reserve
 RVN (disambiguation)